The 2010 Girabola was the 32nd season of top-tier football in Angola. The season ran from 19 February to 31 October 2010. Petro Atlético were the defending champions.

The league comprised 16 teams and the bottom three were relegated to the 2011 Gira Angola.

Interclube were crowned champions, while Desportivo da Huíla, Sporting de Cabinda and Benfica do Lubango were relegated. Daniel Mpele Mpele of Kabuscorp finished as top scorer with 14 goals.

Changes from 2010 season
Relegated: Académica do Lobito, Primeiro de Maio 
Promoted: Benfica do Lubango, FC de Cabinda, Sporting de Cabinda, 
Sagrada Esperança

League table

Results

Season statistics

Top scorers

Hat-tricks

References

External links
Girabola 2010 stats at jornaldosdesportos.sapo.ao
Girabola 2010 standings at girabola.com
Girabola 2010 at Endirect24
Federação Angolana de Futebol

Girabola seasons
1
Angola
Angola